is a Japanese musician, singer, and record producer who co-founded the Moonriders, a group that became one of Japan's most innovative rock bands. He is known to audiences outside Japan for his musical contributions to the video games Mother (1989) and EarthBound (1994), both of which have been released on several soundtracks. More recently, he has composed film scores including The Blind Swordsman: Zatōichi (2003), Tokyo Godfathers (2003), Uzumaki (2000), Chicken Heart (2009), as well as Takeshi Kitano's Outrage trilogy.

Career

Suzuki was born in Tokyo, Japan, the son of actor Akio Suzuki. He has a younger brother, Hirobumi Suzuki. In the early 1970s, Keiichi became involved with the Japanese band Hachimitsu Pie, who released one album in 1973. Later in the 1970s, Suzuki functioned as the occasional leader and regular singer of the Moonriders — the group's first album was in fact credited to "Keiichi Suzuki and the Moonriders". The band included his brother Hirobumi on bass. Afterward, he collaborated with Yellow Magic Orchestra co-founder Yukihiro Takahashi as the duo The Beatniks. He was also a member of the trio Three Blind Moses.

As an actor, Suzuki appeared in the 1980s films; Body Drop Asphalt, Shunji Iwai's Swallowtail, and Love Letter, as well as other films from the late 1990s and early 2000s.

In 1989, Suzuki cowrote the soundtrack to the video game Mother. In 1994, he would write more music for the game's sequel, EarthBound. A few years after EarthBound, Suzuki provided the music for the audio game Real Sound: Kaze no Regret.

His song "Satellite Serenade" was remixed by The Orb and was later featured on Sasha & Digweed's Northern Exposure and The Orb's Auntie Aubrey's Excursions Beyond the Call of Duty compilation.

In February 2008, Suzuki released a new solo album Captain Hate & First Mate Love in collaboration with Keiichi Sokabe, touring together in late spring 2008.  The follow-up Pirate Radio Seasick appeared in 2009, and the third part In Retrospect in January 2011.

Influences
Suzuki cited John Lennon of the Beatles, the Beach Boys, Van Dyke Parks, Andy Partridge of XTC, Godley & Creme, Miklos Rozsa, and Harry Nilsson as influences, particularly on the tracks he composed for the Mother series.

Discography

Solo studio albums
 (1976, Keiichi Suzuki and the Moonriders)
 S.F. (1978), (宇宙からの物体X)
 (1991)
Tokyo Taro Is Living in Tokyo (1993, 東京太郎名義)
Satelliteserenade (1994) – suzuki K1 >> 7.5cc名義
Yes, Paradise, Yes | M.R.B.S.(1999) – suzuki K1 >> 7.5cc名義
No.9 (2004) – with Moonriders
 (2008)
 (2009)
Keiichi Suzuki: Music for Films and Games (2010、サウンドトラック集)
Mother Music Revisited (2021)

Video games

Filmography
 Swallowtail Butterfly (1996)
 Uzumaki (2000)
 The Blind Swordsman: Zatōichi (2003)
 Tokyo Godfathers (2003)
 Chicken Heart (2009)
 For the Plasma (2014)
 His (2020)
 Last Letter (2020)
 Bullets, Bones and Blocked Noses (2021, TV mini-series), Shimura
 Just Remembering (2022), Nagura
 Call Me Chihiro (2023), old musician

References

External links
 
 
 
 the Moonriders official website

1951 births
Japanese film score composers
Japanese male actors
Japanese male film score composers
Japanese record producers
Japanese rock musicians
Living people
Musicians from Tokyo
Video game composers